"The River Unbroken" is a song by American singer-songwriter Dolly Parton, which was released in 1987 as the lead single from her twenty-eighth studio album Rainbow. It was written by Darrell Brown and David Batteau, and produced by Steve "Golde" Goldstein.

"The River Unbroken" was Parton's first single for Columbia, following her move to the label from RCA. The song reached No. 63 on the Billboard Hot Country Songs chart. In Canada, it peaked at No. 51 on the RPM Country Singles chart, and No. 23 on the Adult Contemporary chart.

Critical reception
On its release, Billboard described the song as a "rootsy, rock-flavored ballad" that should "regain her pop stature". Cash Box considered the song "enjoyable" and Parton's voice "as distinctive as ever", but felt "hard country" fans would be "disappointed" with the song's direction ("The lyrics could be country, but the arrangement surely is not").

In a review of Rainbow, Ken Tucker of The Philadelphia Inquirer described the song as having "the firm assurance of a potential hit". In a retrospective review, Barry Weber of AllMusic felt both "The River Unbroken" and "Could I Have Your Autograph" are "somewhat intriguing, but they're certainly not strong enough to survive the glossy, overtly polished production".

Cover versions
 In 1989, American gospel singer Russ Taff recorded his own version of the song for his album The Way Home. For the album, the song's co-writer Darrell Brown contributed background vocals and some production work. The album reached No. 1 on the Billboard Top Contemporary Christian chart.

Track listing
7", CD and cassette single
"The River Unbroken" - 3:56
"More Than I Can Say" - 4:06

7" single (promo)
"The River Unbroken" - 3:56
"The River Unbroken" - 3:56

Personnel
The River Unbroken
 Dolly Parton - lead vocals, harmony vocals, backing vocals
 Julia Waters, Maxine Waters, Richard Dennison - backing vocals
 Waddy Wachtel - acoustic guitar
 Kevin Dukes - electric guitar, slide electric guitar
 Steve "Golde" Goldstein - synthesizer, drum programming
 Bob Glaub - bass
 John Vigran - drum programming

Production
 Steve "Golde" Goldstein - producer
 Richard Bosworth - mixing, recording
 Bernie Grundman - mastering

Other
 Tony Lane, Nancy Donald - art direction
 Annie Leibovitz - photography

Charts

References

1987 singles
Dolly Parton songs
Columbia Records singles
Songs written by Darrell Brown (musician)
1987 songs
Songs written by David Batteau